The German Embassy in Windhoek is Germany's diplomatic mission to Namibia. It is located at Sanlam Centre, 145 Independence Avenue in Windhoek. The current German ambassador is Herbert Beck.

See also
 Foreign relations of Germany
 Germany–Namibia relations

External links 
 German Embassy in Windhoek

Windhoek
Germany–Namibia relations
Diplomatic missions in Windhoek